Stilbosis dulcedo is a moth in the family Cosmopterigidae. It was described by Ronald W. Hodges in 1964. It is found in North America, where it has been recorded from California and Arizona.

Adults have been recorded on wing from February to June.

The larvae feed on Quercus agrifolia, Quercus chrysolepis and Quercus wislizenii.

References

Moths described in 1964
Chrysopeleiinae
Moths of North America